Kirburg is an Ortsgemeinde – a community belonging to a Verbandsgemeinde – in the Westerwaldkreis in Rhineland-Palatinate, Germany.

Geography

The community lies in the Westerwald between Limburg und Siegen. The Wäschebach, which belongs to the Sieg drainage basin, flows through the municipal area. Kirburg belongs to the Verbandsgemeinde of Bad Marienberg, a kind of collective municipality. Its seat is in the like-named town.

History
In 1215, Kirburg had its first documentary mention.

Politics

The municipal council is made up of 12 council members who were elected in a majority vote in a municipal election on 13 June 2004.

Economy and infrastructure

Running right through the community is Bundesstraße 414, leading from Driedorf-Hohenroth to Hachenburg. The nearest Autobahn interchange is Haiger/Burbach on the A 45 (Dortmund–Hanau), some 25 km away. The nearest InterCityExpress stop is the railway station at Montabaur on the Cologne-Frankfurt high-speed rail line.

References

External links
 Kirburg 
  Kirburg in the collective municipality’s Web pages 

Municipalities in Rhineland-Palatinate
Westerwaldkreis